Svilojevo (Hungarian: Szilágyi) is a village located in the municipality of Apatin, West Bačka District, Vojvodina, Serbia. As of 2011 census, the village has a population of 1,179 inhabitants, most of whom are ethnic Hungarians.

History
In 2001, Svilojevo  celebrated one hundred years since its establishment, and in 2006, the more recently renovated church became a hundred years old.

On the session of the Municipality of Apatin in June 2006, the Hungarian gained official in Svilojevo. Previously, Serbian had been the sole official language in this village, although Hungarians had composed a majority in the village.

Demographics

Historical population
 1961: 1,785
 1971: 1,667
 1981: 1,490
 1991: 1,278
 2002: 1,364
 2011: 1,179

Ethnic groups
The ethnic groups as of 2002 census:
 Hungarians = 792 (58.07%)
 Serbs = 403 (29.55%)
 Croats = 47 (3.45%)
 Yugoslavs = 19 (1.39%)
 others.

See also
 List of places in Serbia
 List of cities, towns and villages in Vojvodina

References

 Slobodan Ćurčić, Broj stanovnika Vojvodine, Novi Sad, 1996.

External links 

 Svilojevo

Places in Bačka
West Bačka District
Apatin